Joel Green is a British visual effects artist. He was nominated for an Academy Award in the category Best Visual Effects for the film No Time to Die.

Selected filmography 
 No Time to Die (2021; co-nominated with Charlie Noble, Jonathan Fawkner and Chris Corbould)

References

External links 

Living people
Place of birth missing (living people)
Year of birth missing (living people)
Visual effects artists
Visual effects supervisors